Michael Donald Edwards (born November 24, 1976 in Goshen, New York) is a former Major League Baseball utility player.

Edwards attended high school at Mechanicsburg Area Senior High in Mechanicsburg, Pennsylvania. He holds the MASH records for assists, walks, and saves and is second place in home runs, doubles, RBI, and hits, all to 1984 #1 pick Shawn Abner. Mike was a three-sport athlete at Mechanicsburg, and led the Wildcats' to their first District Basketball Title. Mike's number 7 is currently retired for baseball by the school. Drafted by the Cleveland Indians in the 9th round of the  MLB amateur draft, Edwards made his Major League Baseball debut with the Oakland Athletics on September 20, . After the season, he was removed outright from the 40-man roster, and chose to accept free agency. Edwards graduated from CSUEB and majored in Industrial Engineering alongside Cesar Lafarga. Mike now lives outside of San Francisco with his wife and two kids.

References

External links

1976 births
Living people
Oakland Athletics players
Los Angeles Dodgers players
Pittsburgh Pirates players
Major League Baseball third basemen
Major League Baseball left fielders
Indianapolis Indians players
Kinston Indians players
Mahoning Valley Scrappers players
Akron Aeros players
Buffalo Bisons (minor league) players
Chattanooga Lookouts players
Louisville Bats players
Sacramento River Cats players
Las Vegas 51s players
Baseball players from New York (state)
People from Mechanicsburg, Pennsylvania
People from Goshen, New York
Baseball players from Pennsylvania